Oligomycins are macrolides created by Streptomyces that can be poisonous to other organisms.

Function
They have use as antibiotics.

Oligomycin A is an inhibitor of ATP synthase.  In oxidative phosphorylation research, it is used to prevent state 3 (phosphorylating) respiration. Oligomycin A inhibits ATP synthase by blocking its proton channel (FO subunit), which is necessary for oxidative phosphorylation of ADP to ATP (energy production). The inhibition of ATP synthesis by oligomycin A will significantly reduce electron flow through the electron transport chain; however, electron flow is not stopped completely due to a process known as proton leak or mitochondrial uncoupling.  This process is due to facilitated diffusion of protons into the mitochondrial matrix through an uncoupling protein such as thermogenin, or UCP1.

Administering oligomycin  to rats can result in very high levels of lactate accumulating in the blood and urine.

References 

Macrolide antibiotics
Spiro compounds
Triketones
ATP synthase inhibitors

it:Fosforilazione ossidativa#Inibitori